Bromochlorofluoromethane or fluorochlorobromomethane, is a chemical compound and trihalomethane derivative with the chemical formula CHBrClF. As one of the simplest possible stable chiral compounds, it is useful for fundamental research into this area of chemistry. However, its relative instability to hydrolysis, and lack of suitable functional groups, made separation of the enantiomers of bromochlorofluoromethane especially challenging, and this was not accomplished until almost a century after it was first synthesised, in March 2005, though it has now been done by a variety of methods. More recent research using bromochlorofluoromethane has focused on its potential use for experimental measurement of parity violation, a major unsolved problem in quantum physics.

See also
 Bromochlorodifluoromethane, used in fire extinguishers
 Bromochlorofluoroiodomethane, a theoretical derivative with iodine replacing the hydrogen

References

Halomethanes
Chirality